Ludmila Yevgenyevna Belousova (22 November 1935 – 26 September 2017) was a Soviet and Russian pair skater who represented the Soviet Union. With her partner and husband Oleg Protopopov, she was a two-time Olympic champion (1964, 1968) and four-time World champion (1965–1968). In 1979, the pair defected to Switzerland and became Swiss citizens in 1995. They continued to skate at ice shows and exhibitions through their seventies.

Career 

Belousova started skating relatively late, at age 16. after having seen the ice revue movie "Springtime on ice" with Olympic runner-up and European Champion Eva Pawlik of Austria. She trained in Moscow where she met Oleg Protopopov in the spring of 1954. She moved to Leningrad in 1955 and began training with Protopopov in 1956 following his navy discharge. The pair trained at the VSS Lokomotiv sports club and competed internationally for the USSR. They were coached initially by Igor Moskvin and then by Pyotr Orlov, but parted ways with Orlov after a number of disagreements. The pair then trained without a coach at a rink in Voskresensk, Moscow Oblast. In 1961, they decided to work with Stanislav Zhuk to raise their technical level.

Belousova and Protopopov debuted at the World Championships in 1958, finishing 13th. They competed at their first Olympics two years later, placing ninth. In 1962, they made the World Championship podium for the first time, earning the silver medal. They were the first pair from the Soviet Union or Russia to win a world medal after the pair skating discipline was introduced at the 1908 World Championships (in which only three pairs competed). Later in 1962, they won silver at the European Championships, becoming the second Soviet pair to medal after Nina Zhuk and Stanislav Zhuk (who won silver in 1958, 1959, and 1960).

The pair's first major international gold medal came at the 1964 Winter Olympics. It was the first Olympic pairs gold for the Soviet Union. Belousova and Protopopov began the forty-year Soviet/Russian gold medal streak in pair skating, the longest in Olympic sports history, from 1964 to 2006. They won their first World and European gold medals in 1965, becoming the first Soviet/Russian pair to win those titles.

They became Olympic champions for the second time at the 1968 Winter Olympics. At 32 and 35 years old, respectively, they were among the oldest champions in figure skating. The following season, they won the silver medal at the European Championships and bronze at the World Championships as Irina Rodnina began her reign with her first partner, Alexei Ulanov. Those were the pair's final appearances at major international competitions but they continued competing in the Soviet Union until 1972.

In total, Belousova and Protopopov won two Olympic titles and medalled eight times at both the World and European Championships, including four consecutive World and European gold medals. After retiring from competition, they continued to skate together in shows for many years. In September 2015, they renewed their long-standing tradition of skating in a charitable exhibition in Boston, Massachusetts, at an event called "Evening with Champions".

Belousova and Protopopov contributed to the development of pair skating, including the creation of three death spirals: the backward inside (BiDs), the forward inside (FiDs), and the forward outside (FoDs), which they respectively dubbed the "Cosmic spiral", "Life spiral", and "Love spiral". Dick Button stated: "The Protopopovs are great skaters not only because they were the finest of Olympic champions, but also because their creative impact was extraordinary."

Personal life 
Belousova studied engineering at university. She married Protopopov in December 1957. Although she kept her maiden name after their marriage, the pair were commonly referred to as "The Protopopovs". Eager to keep skating, the couple decided not to have children.

On 24 September 1979, Belousova and Protopopov defected to Switzerland while on tour and applied for political asylum. They settled in Grindelwald and received Swiss citizenship in 1995. Switzerland remained their winter home while their summer home and training center was Lake Placid, New York. On 25 February 2003, they visited Russia after a 23-year asylum, on the invitation of Viacheslav Fetisov. They had their last exhibition dance in 2016, when Belousova was 80 years old.

Competitive highlights

References

External links

Pairs on Ice profile

1935 births
2017 deaths
European Figure Skating Championships medalists
Figure skaters at the 1960 Winter Olympics
Figure skaters at the 1964 Winter Olympics
Figure skaters at the 1968 Winter Olympics
Medalists at the 1964 Winter Olympics
Honoured Masters of Sport of the USSR
Recipients of the Order of the Red Banner of Labour
Olympic figure skaters of the Soviet Union
Olympic gold medalists for the Soviet Union
Olympic medalists in figure skating
Sportspeople from Ulyanovsk
Russian female pair skaters
Soviet defectors
Soviet emigrants to Switzerland
Soviet female pair skaters
World Figure Skating Championships medalists
Medalists at the 1968 Winter Olympics
BBC Sports Personality World Sport Star of the Year winners